Pioneer is a village in West Carroll Parish, Louisiana, United States. The population was 171 at the 2000 census.

Former Louisiana Commissioner of Agriculture and Forestry Dave L. Pearce (1952–1956; 1960–1976) attended the former elementary school in Pioneer.

Geography
Pioneer is located at  (32.736730, -91.434523).

According to the United States Census Bureau, the village has a total area of 1.1 square miles (2.8 km), all land.

Demographics

As of the census of 2000, there were 171 people, 65 households, and 39 families residing in the village. The racial makeup of the village was 47.37% White and 52.63% African American.

There were 65 households, out of which 27.7% had children under the age of 18 living with them, 35.4% were married couples living together, 23.1% had a female householder with no husband present, and 38.5% were non-families. 32.3% of all households were made up of individuals, and 13.8% had someone living alone who was 65 years of age or older. The average household size was 2.63 and the average family size was 3.40.

In the village, the population was spread out, with 29.2% under the age of 18, 14.0% from 18 to 24, 22.2% from 25 to 44, 21.6% from 45 to 64, and 12.9% who were 65 years of age or older. The median age was 30 years. For every 100 females, there were 76.3 males. For every 100 females age 18 and over, there were 80.6 males.

The median income for a household in the village was $17,614, and the median income for a family was $19,375. Males had a median income of $17,917 versus $23,125 for females. The per capita income for the village was $9,842. About 41.5% of families and 50.3% of the population were below the poverty line, including 58.8% of those under the age of eighteen and 23.7% of those 65 or over.

Education
Public schools in West Carroll Parish are operated by the West Carroll Parish School Board. The village of Pioneer was zoned to Pioneer Elementary School prior to the end of the 2006-07 school year. The school was closed as part of a parish-wide school consolidation plan that also saw another campus, Fiske Union Elementary School, closed as well. At the beginning of the 2007-08 school year, most Pioneer students were moved to nearby Forest High School in the village of Forest. Approximately 55 students who lived in the northeastern corner of the area zoned to Pioneer were sent to Oak Grove High School in Oak Grove.

References

External links
 Pioneer Progress Community Progress Site for Pioneer, Louisiana

Villages in Louisiana
Villages in West Carroll Parish, Louisiana